Oh Se-hun (born 15 January 1999) is a South Korean footballer, who plays as a forward for Shimizu S-Pulse.

A towering center-forward, he is considered one of the most promising players of his generation in South Korea, regarding his finishing (both on headers and shoots), positioning, passing and ball possession, as well as his physical qualities.

Club career

The beginnings and Ulsan Hyundai 
A graduate from Hyundai High School in Seoul, in 2018 he signed his first professional contract with K League 1 team Ulsan Hyundai. He was originally set to reinforce the youth squad of the "Horangi" in the national reserve league: however, on March 1, 2018, Ulsan's manager Kim Do-hoon caught everyone by surprise by giving Oh his senior debut at only 19 years old, as he chose him for the starting XI against Jeonbuk Hyundai Motors in the first game of the season. He played for 56 minutes before being replaced by Júnior Negrão, and his side eventually suffered a 2–0 away loss.

After making his continental debut in the AFC Champions League in April, coming in as a substitute for Cho Young-cheol in a 2–2 away draw against Kawasaki Frontale, throughout the year Oh went on to make other two brief appearances in K League 1, coming off the bench in two consecutive matches at the start of May, against Suwon Samsung Bluewings and Pohang Steelers.

Military service: Asan Mugunghwa and the Sangmu 
Approaching 2019, Oh decided to serve his compulsory military duty, so he could focus on his development as a player: as a result, he was loaned to Asan Mugunghwa, which at the time featured young players attending military service. He made his debut with the Police-owned team on March 2, 2019, playing the entirety of the 0–3 away win against Jeonnam Dragons and scoring his first senior goal at the 82th minute. Frequently featured in the starting XI through the whole K League 2 season, he concluded the year with 30 appearances (26 of which as a starter) and seven goals.

The following year, as Asan Mugunghwa was disbanded and replaced by civil team Chungnam Asan, Oh and several other players moved to the Army's main football team, Sangju Sangmu, which was set to play in the K League 1. He was given the number 18 shirt and made his debut for the Sangmu on June 13, 2020, in a home match against Pohang Steelers: although his side suffered a 4–2 loss, he scored both of Sangju's goals (one of which being a penalty). He featured regularly during the whole summer, scoring another couple of goals. However, on August 15, 2020, he suffered an injury against FC Seoul and got ruled out for a month.

Some weeks before, on August 2, during an away match against Gangwon, a collision between him and Jung Ji-yong during a header attempt left the latter with a concussion, causing him a loss of consciousness for some minutes: Oh, who got booked following the impact, was visibly shocked. Nevertheless, later on in the match he was able to assist Kim Bo-seob's temporary equalizer, and the teams ended up drawing 2-2. Luckily, Jung fully recovered from the accident and was soon able to get on the pitch again.

Oh returned on the pitch at the end of September, but suffered another injury just one week later, as the Sangmu lost 4–1 to his home team Ulsan. This forced him to miss the last three matches of the season. Even though bad luck kneecapped his season, Oh still managed to register 13 appearances (all as a starter) and four goals, contributing to the Sangmu's highest finish ever in the top-tier league, with the club obtaining a final fourth place despite of being destined to automatic relegation since the start of 2020, due to their planned re-location.

In 2021, Oh spent the last months of his military service in K League 2, as the Army's team moved to Gimcheon. He was given the number 9 shirt. He featured in four games, three of which as a starter, before exiting the squad as summer approached, in preparation to his return to Ulsan.

Return to Ulsan 
Right after he completed his military service and came back to Ulsan Hyundai, manager Hong Myung-bo included him in the list of players that would travel to the centralized venue in Bangkok and take part in the group stage matches of the AFC Champions League throughout June and July 2021.

Mainly used as a back-up striker for Lukas Hinterseer and Kim Ji-Hyeon, he registered his first appearance for Ulsan after almost three years on June 26, 2021, when he came on as a substitute and assisted the only goal of the match (scored by Hinterseer) against Viettel. He also started against Kaya-Iloilo on July 2, scoring a brace as his side obtained a 3–0 win.

International career 
He represented South Korea at several youth levels.

In 2015, he was selected by head coach Choi Jin-cheul to take part in the FIFA U-17 World Cup in Chile. Being one of the youngest members of the squad, he was used a substitute, but still managed to leave his mark in the competition: coming in for Lee Seung-woo in the injury time of the group stage match against Guinea, he scored the winner just one minute since he had got on the pitch, as he sent the ball in the top corner of the net after being assisted by You Ju-an. Oh's goal was eventually included in FIFA's Top 10 list of the tournament's best goals. South Korea was eventually eliminated from the World Cup in the round of 16, following a 2–0 loss against Belgium.

In 2018, he took part both in the Toulon Tournament, where the South Korean selection was eliminated in the group stage, and the AFC Under-19 Championship, where his side reached the final before losing 1–2 to eventual winners Saudi Arabia.

In 2019, he was selected by head coach Chung Jung-yong to take part in the FIFA U-20 World Cup in Poland, being the only player in South Korea's 21-men list who was serving his military duty. Except for the debut in the group stage against Portugal, Oh started every single match of his side, scoring two consecutive headers, against Argentina and Japan (in the round of 16), and one penalty in South Korea's successful shoot-out against Senegal in the quarter-finals. As a result, he played a considerable role in the Taeguk Warriors' road to the tournament's final, then lost to Ukraine with the score of 3–1.

In 2020, he was selected by head coach Kim Hak-bum to be part of the squad that would participate in the AFC U-23 Championship in Thailand. Used frequently during the tournament, he scored a brace in South Korea's 2–1 win against Uzbekistan in the last game of the group stage, thus getting involved in the Taeguk Warriors first victory of the competition, as they beat Saudi Arabia after the extra-time in the final and qualified for the Olympics.

 Personal life 
He's similarly as tall as his father, while his mother is a former handball player. From a sports-related point of view, his main role model is fellow South Korean and forward Kim Shin-wook, with whom Oh has been likened due to similar physical structure and aerial ability.

He went to the same high school as Choi Jun: the two have been team-mates and have represented South Korea at a youth international level for years.

He's probably religious: sometimes, he can be seen reciting a prayer at the end of a match.

 Career statistics 
As of 20 February 2022

Honours

 International South Korea U19AFC U-19 Championship runner-up: 2018South Korea U20FIFA U-20 World Cup runner-up: 2019South Korea U23'
AFC U-23 Championship: 2020

References

1999 births
Living people
Association football forwards
South Korean footballers
Ulsan Hyundai FC players
Asan Mugunghwa FC players
Gimcheon Sangmu FC players
K League 1 players
K League 2 players
Sportspeople from Incheon
South Korea under-20 international footballers
South Korea under-23 international footballers
Shimizu S-Pulse players
J1 League players
Expatriate footballers in Japan
South Korean expatriate sportspeople in Japan